Paschal Onyedika Okoli (born 17 October 1997) is a Nigerian professional footballer who plays as a midfielder for Premier League of Bosnia and Herzegovina club NK Čelik Zenica.

Club career

Early career
Okoli signed his first professional contract with Turkish Süper Lig club Bursaspor on 14 July 2017. He made his professional debut with Bursaspor in a 2–1 league loss to Galatasaray on 24 September 2017.

While at the club, Okoli also played for the U21 team of Bursaspor, making 5 appearances and scoring one goal.

From February to June 2018, he was loaned out to Premier League of Bosnia and Herzegovina club NK Čelik Zenica. He played 7 matches for Čelik and scored one goal in that period.

After coming back to Bursaspor in June 2018, Okoli didn't make a single appearance in the 2018–19 Süper Lig season, and in February 2019, he left Bursaspor.

Čelik Zenica
On 18 February 2019, shortly after leaving Bursaspor, Okoli returned to and signed for Čelik Zenica.

He made his debut for Čelik on 2 March 2019, in a 1–1 league draw against FK Tuzla City.

Career statistics

Club

References

External links
 
 

1995 births
Living people
Nigerian footballers
Bursaspor footballers
NK Čelik Zenica players
Süper Lig players
Premier League of Bosnia and Herzegovina players
Association football midfielders
Nigerian expatriate footballers
Nigerian expatriate sportspeople in Turkey
Expatriate footballers in Turkey
Expatriate footballers in Bosnia and Herzegovina